The Tyrrell 025 was the car the Tyrrell Formula One team used to compete in the 1997 Formula One season.  It was driven by Mika Salo, who was in his third season with the team, and Jos Verstappen, who moved from Footwork.

Development
The 025 was an evolution of the previous year's 024, with Ford V8 engines instead of Yamaha V10s in the interests of reliability.  However, this came at the expense of power against the V10 cars.

As ever, the team used a fair degree of technical innovation. The 025 eschewed a double support front wing for a single plane unit aimed at cleaning up airflow under the car. On high-downforce circuits (such as Monaco), two additional wings were installed on either side of the cockpit.  To distinguish between the drivers, Verstappen's were painted yellow and Salo's dark orange.  These "X-wings" would be banned during 1998 after safety concerns in the pitlane, by which point other teams had begun using them.

Race history
The year was largely disappointing for the team. The chassis was well-balanced, the drivers were quick and the strategy was good but the increase in competitiveness in the sport saw them restricted to a battle with fellow V8 runner Minardi for much of the season.

The team's two points came from an inventive non-stop run from Salo at the 1997 Monaco Grand Prix to finish fifth, despite a damaged front wing.  They would prove to be Tyrrell's last points in F1, as Ken Tyrrell subsequently sold the team to British American Tobacco, becoming British American Racing for the  season. Paul Stoddart, later owner of Minardi, became one of the principal sponsors. He  almost bought the team and indeed had offered Ken Tyrrell a three-year plan to completely overhaul the team's technical department which included an in-house wind tunnel and use of his European Aviation company's aircraft for the team's transportation but the deal with BAR had already been done.

The team eventually finished tenth in the Constructors' Championship, thanks to the two points earned by Salo at Monaco.

Complete Formula One results
(key) (results in bold indicate pole position)

References

Tyrrell Formula One cars
1997 Formula One season cars